Kalaeloa is a census-designated place (CDP) in Honolulu County, Hawaii, United States.  The population was 2,364 at the 2020 census. The community occupies the location of the former Naval Air Station Barbers Point, which was closed in 1999 and subsequently transferred to the State of Hawaii. The geographical name, Ka lae loa, means "long point" in Hawaiian and is the native name for what has been called Barbers Point on Oahu. The area was known as Barbers Point because Captain Henry Barber wrecked his ship on a coral shoal at this location on October 31, 1796.

On July 1, 2002, the Hawaii Community Development Authority became the redevelopment authority for Kalaeloa. The former Naval Air Station runways and associated facilities are now Kalaeloa Airport.

Barbers Point Housing is that part of Kalaeloa retained temporarily by the U.S. Navy for housing.

Geography
Kalaeloa is located at 21°19'28" North, 158°4'59" West (21.324550, -158.083156).

Climate
Tropical savanna climates have monthly mean temperature above 18 °C (64 °F) in every month of the year and typically a pronounced dry season, with the driest month having precipitation less than 60mm (2.36 in) of precipitation.

Demographics

As of the 2000 Census, there were 67 people, 16 households, and 16 families residing in the CDP. The racial makeup of the CDP was 88.06% White, 5.97% Asian, 2.99% Pacific Islander, and 2.99% from two or more races.  2.99% of the population were Hispanic or Latino of any race.

There were 16 households, out of which 87.5% had children under the age of 18 living with them, 100.0% were married couples living together, and 0.0% had someone living alone who was 65 years of age or older.  The average household size was 4.19 (average family size was also 4.19).

In the CDP the population was spread out, with 50.7% under the age of 18, 1.5% from 18 to 24, 38.8% from 25 to 44, 9.0% from 45 to 64, and none who were 65 years of age or older.  The median age was 18 years.  For every 100 females, there were 91.4 males.  For every 100 females age 18 and over, there were 106.3 males.

The median income for a household in the CDP was $65,625. Males had a median income of $49,531 versus $0 for females. The per capita income for the CDP was $21,083.  None of the population was below the poverty line.

History
In October 1795, during a trading voyage to China, the ship, the Arthur arrived in Hawaii lead by Captain Henry Barber. He set sail for Kauai after stopping for provisions at Waikiki. After passing the entrance to Pearl Harbor, the Arthur wrecked on a reef in high surf and was completely destroyed. Six crew members drowned, but Barber and the other fifteen members of his crew made it ashore in their small boats. The point where the wreck occurred was known thereafter as Barbers Point.

Nearby facilities and installations
The immediate vicinity of Kalaeloa, which extends over the southwestern tip of the island of Oahu, includes Coast Guard Air Station Barbers Point, Barbers Point Lighthouse, Kalaeloa Airport, Campbell Industrial Park, including AES Hawaii Power Plant, Hawaii Refinery owned by Par Petroleum Corporation to the southwest and the Barbers Point Harbor. Remnants of the old base remain, such as the streets named after aircraft carriers (i.e. Yorktown, Lexington, etc.), chapels, a post office, and the Navy Exchange which reopened as an indoor go-cart track in January 2011.

In 2017, the state of Hawaii under the Kalaeloa Authority within the Hawaii Community Development Authority (HCDA) rejected a plan to allow SunStrong II LLC to lease 19 acres and build a 5-megawatt photovoltaic solar farm north of the Kalaeloa Heritage Park. Aloha Solar Energy Fund II is leasing 24 acres of HCDA land near the Kalaeloa Airport to build a 5-megawatt photovoltaic solar farm. The United States Navy supplies power to Kalaeloa. SunStrong II's project included a 12-kilovolt line extension to Hawaiian Electric Co.'s (HECO) grid which would have allowed HECO an opportunity to provide power to the Kalaeloa district.

Education
Hawaii Department of Education operates Barbers Point Elementary School in Kalaeloa CDP.

Notes

References

External links

 Hawaii Community Development Authority – Kalaeloa

Census-designated places in Honolulu County, Hawaii
Closed military facilities of the United States in the United States